The Radial Pair: Video Soundtrack is a soundtrack released by English musician Gary Numan. The album contains the music from the video The Radial Pair which features Numan and fellow stunt pilot Norman Lees performing aerobatics. Numan was to sign to another label around the time of this fan club only release, and they suggested adding vocals to these tracks and release it, to give Numan more time to record a more conventional studio album. Numan eventually decided against signing to the label, and some of the tracks were developed for what was to be his next studio album, Sacrifice.

Track listing
All tracks written by Gary Numan.

"Kiss Me and Die" – 5:49
"Mission" – 3:02
"Dark Rain" – 2:47
"Cloud Dancing" – 3:48
"Virus" – 3:04
"Cold House" – 3:33
"Red Sky" – 3:18
"Machine Heart" – 2:26

Personnel
Gary Numan – performer, producer, engineer, mixing
John Dibbs – photography

References

1994 soundtrack albums
Film soundtracks
Gary Numan soundtracks